Sea Foam Stadium is the football field on the campus of Concordia University, Saint Paul in Saint Paul, Minnesota. It opened in 2009, and seats about 3,500 spectators.  The Stadium includes a football/soccer field with artificial turf, running track, scoreboard, lights, bleachers, parking, concession facilities, locker rooms, weight room, press box, outdoor plaza, and inflatable dome, somewhat resembling a marshmallow, during the winter months.

When the final phases are completed, the stadium will have cost a total of $14.5 million to construct.

Notes

Sports venues in Minnesota
Concordia Golden Bears football
College football venues
Athletics (track and field) venues in Minnesota
College soccer venues in the United States
Concordia University (Saint Paul, Minnesota)
2009 establishments in Minnesota
Sports venues completed in 2009
Ultimate (sport) venues